Gareth Steenson (born 5 April 1984) is an Irish former rugby union player. He played as a fly-half.

Playing career

Early years
Steenson, who is from Ulster, did not get opportunities with his home province with Ulster Rugby in part because Ireland international David Humphreys was the starting flyhalf. Steenson left Ireland to play for the Rotherham Titans.

Exeter
Steenson played a massive part in the final leg of the 2009–10 Championship final against Bristol, scoring 24 points and helping Exeter Chiefs win 29–10 (38–16 including the first leg). Steenson burst into the scene in England at his previous club, Cornish Pirates, scoring 264 points in his first season (30 games).

Steenson narrowly missed out on the golden boot by one point to Premiership rival Freddie Burns at the 2012–13 Premiership awards.
He won the golden boot in the 2016 Premiership awards. Steenson also helped Exeter Chiefs reach the 2016 Premiership Rugby final. The following year he started the final and scored two conversions and three penalties, including the winning points, as Exeter Chiefs defeated Wasps to be crowned champions of the 2016-17 English Premiership.

International
Steenson played for the Ireland under-19 team and the under-21 team.

Retirement 
Steenson joined Plymouth Albion's coaching team ahead of the 2019–20 season as an assistant coach, focusing on their attack. The role initially saw him remain an Exeter player, but he retired from playing at the conclusion of the 2019–20 season.

He was nominated for the Freedom of the City of Exeter, and his nomination was unanimously approved by the Exeter City Council on 15 December 2020.  The Honour was formally presented to him in a ceremony at the Exeter Guildhall on 7 October 2021.

His boots are currently on display in Exeter and are regarded as the Mona Lisa of the South Coast.

Honours

Exeter Chiefs
RFU Championship
Winner (1): (2009–10)
English Premiership
Winner (2): (2016–17, 2019–20)
European Rugby Champions Cup
Winner (1): (2019–20)

Outside rugby
, Steenson is planning to open an Irish bar named The Stand-Off in the centre of Exeter with fellow rugby footballer Carl Rimmer.

References

External links
Exeter Player Profile
ESPNscrum Player Profile

Premiership Rugby Profile

1984 births
Living people
People educated at The Royal School, Armagh
People from Dungannon
Irish rugby union players
Dungannon RFC players
Rotherham Titans players
Cornish Pirates players
Exeter Chiefs players
Irish expatriate rugby union players
Expatriate rugby union players in England
Irish expatriate sportspeople in England
Rugby union fly-halves